Curt Miller (born October 6, 1968) is an American basketball coach, currently the head coach of the Los Angeles Sparks of the WNBA. He previously served as the head coach of the Connecticut Sun from 2016-2022 and Bowling Green State University from 2001–2012 and Indiana University from 2012–2014, and spent one season as an assistant to Brian Agler with the Los Angeles Sparks.

Assistant coaching career
Miller served as an assistant coach at Colorado State, helping the school to an 81-20 (.802) overall record during his three seasons there. He also served as an assistant at Cleveland State and Syracuse.

On March 31, 2015, the Los Angeles Sparks hired Miller as an assistant coach.

Head coaching career

Bowling Green
During his tenure at Bowling Green he compiled a 258–92 record including 135–41 in the Mid-American Conference. He was named MAC Coach of the Year 6 times, and won the conference regular season title 8 straight times between 2005–2012. His best season came in 2006 when he led the Falcons to a 31–4 mark, including a sweet sixteen appearance in the NCAA tournament.

Indiana University
When Miller was negotiating a contract extension with Bowling Green in 2005, he included a "dream clause" in which Miller could list a few of his personal destination jobs. The Indiana Hoosiers were on that list and, when an opening for head women's basketball coach occurred at the school in 2012, he applied for and got the position. Miller signed a six-year deal worth $275,000 a year. Miller resigned on July 25, 2014 citing health and family reasons.

Connecticut Sun
After one season as an assistant with the Los Angeles Sparks, Miller returned to the head coaching ranks. He was announced as the new head coach of the Connecticut Sun on December 17, 2015. In his second season with the Sun in 2017 he was named WNBA coach of the year. While working with the Sun, Miller was "the first openly gay, male coach in college or professional basketball". His 2019 team made the WNBA finals but lost to the Washington Mystics in the five games. The Sun were knocked out in the Semifinals in 2020.  His 2021 team finished the regular season in first place with a 26–6 record. but were upset in the Semifinals by the Chicago Sky. He was named WNBA coach of the year for the second time in 2021.

Head Coaching Record

NCAA

WNBA

|-
| align="left" | Connecticut Sun
| align="left" |2016
|34||14||20|||| align="center" | 5th in East ||—||—||—||—
| align="center" |Missed Playoffs
|-
| align="left" | Connecticut Sun
| align="left" |2017
|34||21||13|||| align="center" | 2nd in East ||1||0||1||
| align="center" |Lost in Eastern Conference Semi-Finals
|-
| align="left" | Connecticut Sun
| align="left" |2018
|34||21||13|||| align="center" | 3rd in East ||1||0||1||
| align="center" |Lost in Eastern Conference Semi-Finals
|-
| align="left" | Connecticut Sun
| align="left" |2019
|34||23||11|||| align="center" | 2nd in East ||8||5||3||
| align="center" |Lost in WNBA Finals
|-
| align="left" | Connecticut Sun
| align="left" | 2020
| 22 || 10 || 12 ||  || align="center" | 2nd in East || 7 || 4 || 3 || 
| align="center" |Lost in Semifinals
|-
| align="left" | Connecticut Sun
| align="left" | 2021
| 32 || 26 || 6 ||  || align="center" | 1st in East || 4 || 1 || 3 || 
| align="center" |Lost in Semifinals
|-
| align="left" | Connecticut Sun
| align="left" | 2022
| 36 || 25 || 11 ||  || align="center" | 2nd in East || 12 || 6 || 6 || 
| align="center" |Lost in WNBA Finals
|-class="sortbottom"
| align="left" |Career
| || 222 || 136 || 86 ||  ||  || 33 || 16 || 17 ||

References

External links

1958 births
Living people
American women's basketball coaches
Baldwin Wallace University alumni
Basketball coaches from Pennsylvania
Bowling Green Falcons women's basketball coaches
Cleveland State Vikings women's basketball coaches
Colorado State Rams women's basketball coaches
Connecticut Sun coaches
Indiana Hoosiers women's basketball coaches
Los Angeles Sparks coaches
People from Erie County, Pennsylvania
Syracuse Orange women's basketball coaches
American LGBT sportspeople
Women's National Basketball Association general managers